Edith Kunhardt Davis (September 30, 1937 – January 2, 2020), also known as E. K. Davis, was an American writer. She is known for writing more than 70 children's books.

Biography
Davis was born as Edith Turner Kunhardt on September 30, 1937 in Morristown, New Jersey, to Philip B. Kunhardt, a textile executive, and Dorothy Kunhardt, a writer. She attended Miss Porter's School and graduated from Bryn Mawr College in 1959 with a degree in art history.

When Davis was 3 years old in 1940, her mother Dorothy Kunhardt wrote Pat the Bunny dedicated to Davis.

Between 1959 and 1971, she married Edward Shippen Davis.

Davis started her career with Golden Books as an editorial assistant and ended up being a senior editor. She also wrote sequels to Pat the Bunny such as Pat the Cat, Pat the Puppy, and Pat the Christmas Bunny.

In 2020, she died at the age of 82.

Writings
 Pompeii — Buried Alive! (1987)
 Honest Abe (1993)
 I'll Love You Forever, Anyway. (1995)
 My Mother, the Bunny and Me (2016)
 Ned's Number Book
 Martha's House

References

1937 births
2020 deaths
American children's writers
American women children's writers
20th-century American women writers
21st-century American women writers
Miss Porter's School alumni
Bryn Mawr College alumni
People from Morristown, New Jersey
Writers from New Jersey
American literary editors